This list of governors of South Kivu includes governors or equivalent officerholders of the South Kivu province of the Democratic Republic of the Congo, created in 1989 when the former Kivu Province was divided into South Kivu, North Kivu and Maniema.
It also includes a list of governors of the earlier province named Kivu Central, then Sud-Kivu, between 1963 and 1966.

Kivu Central (1963–1966)

The province of Kivu Central (the present South Kivu) was created on 18 May 1963 out of part of the former Kivu province.
The province of Sud-Kivu was formed on 25 April 1966 when the provinces of Kivu Central and Maniema were united. 
On 28 December 1966 Sud-Kivu became part of the restored Kivu province.

Second period (1988 – present)

The governors were:

See also

List of governors of Kivu
Lists of provincial governors of the Democratic Republic of the Congo

References

South Kivu
Governors of provinces of the Democratic Republic of the Congo